Officer 444 is a 1926 film serial directed by Francis Ford and Ben F. Wilson, produced by Goodwill Productions and released by the independent Davis Distributing Division.

Plot
Officer 444, a heroic policeman, does battle with The Frog, a criminal mastermind who is trying to get his hands on Haverlyte, a formula that is so powerful whoever had it would possess enough power to control the entire world.

Cast
 Ben F. Wilson - Officer 444
 Neva Gerber - Gloria Grey
 Ruth Royce - The Vulture
 Al Ferguson - Dr. Blakely
 Lafe McKee - Capt. Jerry Dugan
 Jack Mower - Officer Patrick Michael Casey
 Arthur Beckel - James J. Haverly
 Harry McDonald - Snoopy
 Frank Baker - Dago Frank
 Philip Ford - Haverly's Son (as Phil Ford)
 Francis Ford - Fire Chief
 Margaret Mann - Nurse
 August Vollmer - Himself - August Vollmer

See also
 List of film serials
 List of film serials by studio

References

External links

1926 films
1920s action films
American action films
American silent serial films
American black-and-white films
Films directed by Francis Ford
Films directed by Ben F. Wilson
1920s American films
1920s English-language films
Silent action films
English-language action films